The Satélite Tecnológico ("Technologic Satellite" in English) or SATEC, was a microsatellite of scientific applications, designed, developed, built and tested by Brazilian technicians, engineers and scientists working at INPE (National Institute for Space Research).

Features 
The primary objective of SATEC was to test the technological equipment embedded in the VLS-1, providing more information for future applications.

The SATEC scientific satellite had the following characteristics:

 Format: parallelepiped with 61 cm x 66 cm x 66 cm
 Mass: 
 Orbit: Heliosynchronous
 Stabilization: By rotation at 120 rpm
 Precision: 1 degree
 Altitude: 750 kilometers

Payload 
The instrumentation shipped in SATEC was as follows:

 Solar generator: Silicon cells generating 20 W
 Battery: Type NiCd – 5 Ah
 PCU: with linear series technology
 GPS receiver: adapted to the conditions of flight
 Transmitter: S-band with BPSK modulation

Mission 
SATEC, which had an estimated life of 6 months, was lost with UNOSAT in the explosion of the VLS-1 launch vehicle on 23 August 2003 in an explosion three days before the launch date. This event came to be known as Accident of Alcantara.

References

External links 
 Programa SATEC 
SATEC Gunter's Space Page

2003 in spaceflight
Satellites of Brazil